Mael Ísa Ua Coinne was an iconic Irish lawyer who died in 1126. 

A native of what is now County Tyrone, Ua Coinne was at his death regarded as The most learned of the Gaeidhel of Erinn in jurisprudence and in the Ord Patraic.

His surname is now rendered as O'Quinn or Quinn.

External links
 http://www.ucc.ie/celt/published/T100005B/index.html
 http://www.irishtimes.com/ancestor/surname/index.cfm?fuseaction=Go.&UserID=

12th-century Irish lawyers
Medieval Gaels from Ireland
12th-century Irish writers
People from County Tyrone
1126 deaths
Year of birth unknown